Garnon Davies is a Welsh actor, best known for his television appearances.

Life
Davies was born in Pyle near Bridgend, South Wales, on 16 December 1982. He attended Ysgol Y ferch O'r Sger primary school and then went on to Welsh-speaking secondary school Ysgol Gyfun Llanhari. After a few years at that school he went on to study for his GCSEs and A-levels in Porthcawl Comprehensive School.

On leaving Porthcawl Comprehensive Davies attended the prestigious Webber Douglas Academy of Dramatic Art in Kensington, London where he trained as an actor for 3 years. Since leaving he has played many roles on TV and in theatre but is mostly known for his work in Channel 4's Hollyoaks where he played Elliot Bevan. Since leaving Channel 4's Hollyoaks, Davies has gone on to appearing in stage and screen productions. Working in Wales and on shows such as Doctors, Da Vinci's Demons and Holby City.

In 2008, he participated in a campaign held by the Anti-Bullying Alliance.

Davies has been working at drama school Italia Conti Academy of Theatre Arts since 2019 where he teaches acting and musical theatre.

References

External links 

Ex-Hollyoaks stars Kent Riley and Garnon Davies team up to write their own comedy mocumentary (Liverpool Echo)
Culture vulture: Actor Garnon Davies (Wales Online)

Welsh male television actors
Living people
Welsh male stage actors
People educated at Porthcawl Comprehensive School
People educated at Ysgol Gyfun Llanhari
Welsh-speaking actors
1982 births